Help Cure Muscular Dystrophy is a volunteer computing project that runs on the BOINC platform. 

It is a joint effort of the French muscular dystrophy charity, L'Association française contre les myopathies; and L'Institut de biologie moléculaire et cellulaire (Molecular and Cellular Biology Institute).

Project purpose
Help Cure Muscular Dystrophy studies the function of various proteins that are produced by the two hundred genes known to be involved in the production of neuromuscular proteins by modelling the protein-protein interactions of the forty thousand relevant proteins that are listed in the Protein Data Bank.  More specifically, it models how a protein would be affected when another protein or a ligand docks with it.

See also
 BOINC
 List of volunteer computing projects
 Muscular dystrophy
 World Community Grid

External links
Help Cure Muscular Dystrophy

References

Berkeley Open Infrastructure for Network Computing projects
Science in society
Free science software
Muscular dystrophy organizations
Volunteer computing projects